Sharafabad (also Romanized as Sharafābād; also known as Sharafa, Sharafeh, and Sharehfeh) is a village in Sina Rural District, in the Central District of Varzaqan County, East Azerbaijan Province, Iran. At the 2006 census, its population was 694, in 140 families.

References 

Towns and villages in Varzaqan County